Puente del Congosto is a municipality located in the province of Salamanca, Castile and León, Spain. As of 2016 the municipality has a population of 236 inhabitants.

The name Puente del Congosto (Bridge of the Congosto) is apocopic from Puente del Arco Angosto (Bridge of the Narrow Arch).  It references the bridge over the river Tormes on the road between Ávila and Ciudad Rodrigo.  The bridge had a memorable narrow arch, from which only a side wall exists in the present days.

References

Municipalities in the Province of Salamanca